The bluespotted watchman goby (Cryptocentrus pavoninoides) is a species of goby native to the western central Pacific Ocean where it occurs in coastal waters at depths of from  forming small colonies on the sea floor.  It grows to a length of  SL.

References

bluespotted watchman goby
Fish of Indonesia
bluespotted watchman goby